The 2012 Tokyo gubernatorial election took place on December 16, 2012, which was held on the same day as the general election.

Background
After long-term Governor Shintaro Ishihara suddenly resigned to return to national politics ahead of the then-looming next general election. A field of nine candidates emerged, with the front-runner being Naoki Inose, who had been vice-governor under Ishihara from 2007 to 2012, and then acting governor after Ishihara's abrupt resignation. Inose vowed to follow Ishihara's policies.

Candidates
 Mac Akasaka (real name: Makoto Tonami) - Therapist, activist, perennial candidate. Founder and leader of the Smile Party.
 Masaichi Igarashi - Member of the board of directors of an international exchange body.
 Naoki Inose -  Journalist, historian, social critic. Then vice-governor of Tokyo and acting governor.
 Shigefumi Matsuzawa - Former governor of Kanagawa Prefecture.
 Yoshiro Nakamatsu (Dr. NakaMats)- Inventor, perennial candidate.
 Takashi Sasagawa - Former LDP General Council Chairman.
 Tokuma Suginomori (TOKMA) - Rock musician. Director of the Happiness Realization Party's youth division.
 Kenji Utsunomiya - Lawyer. Former head of the Japan Federation of Bar Associations from 2010 to 2012.
 Shigenobu Yoshida - Former Japanese ambassador to Nepal.

Campaign
Information campaign for the polls was administered by the Tokyo Metropolitan Election Administration Commission. AKB48's Minami Takahashi, Tomomi Itano and Yui Yokoyama (also of NMB48) were appointed as image characters.

Result
The result was a landslide victory for Inose, who received 4,338,936 votes, setting a new record for the total number of votes in a Tokyo gubernatorial election. The previous record was 3.61 million cast for the socialist Governor Ryokichi Minobe in 1971.

References

2012
December 2012 events in Japan
2012 in Tokyo
2012 elections in Japan